The 2012 Hungarian Grand Prix (formally the Formula 1 Eni Magyar Nagydíj 2012) was a Formula One motor race that took place at the Hungaroring circuit near Mogyoród, Hungary on 29 July 2012. It was the eleventh round of the 2012 season, and the 27th running of the Hungarian Grand Prix as a round of the World Championship.

Lewis Hamilton started the sixty nine lap race from pole position—his first since the 2012 Malaysian Grand Prix—alongside Romain Grosjean, in his career-best starting position. Hamilton went on to win the race with Kimi Räikkönen second and Grosjean finishing third.

Report

Background
Regulation changes
Red Bull Racing were referred to race stewards at the German Grand Prix after FIA Technical Delegate Jo Bauer noted that their engine maps had the potential to violate the technical regulations. Red Bull stood accused of manipulating the relationship between the torque produced by the Red Bull RB8 and the degree to which the throttle was open—particularly in medium-speed corners—thereby allowing more air to pass through the exhaust and over the diffuser, generating more downforce. Red Bull were cleared of wrongdoing, as, in the stewards' words, they had not technically broken any rules, but the FIA announced plans to rewrite the regulations governing throttle mapping so as to outlaw the practice entirely ahead of the Hungarian Grand Prix.

Tyre supplier Pirelli brought its white-banded medium compound tyre as the harder "prime" tyre and the yellow-banded soft compound tyre as the softer "option" tyre. It was the first time at the track in the single tyre supplier era (2008–present(Bridgestone then Pirelli)) where the 'supersoft' tyre had not been used.

Driver changes
Dani Clos took Narain Karthikeyan's place once again for the first free practice session on Friday morning. Jules Bianchi drove in the place of Nico Hülkenberg at Force India, while Valtteri Bottas drove for Williams, replacing Bruno Senna.

Race
At the end of the formation lap, Michael Schumacher stopped in the 19th place grid position, instead of 17th where he had qualified. Yellow lights were flashed as a result, with the intention of waving the cars through for a second formation lap. However, Schumacher switched his car off believing that the race was being delayed. The cars were waved through for the second formation lap, and Schumacher had to be pushed into the pits for his car to be restarted. Once his car was restarted, he failed to activate the pit speed limiter and exceeded the pit speed limit while driving to the end of the pits for the start of the race.

At the start of the race, Sebastian Vettel attempted to pass Romain Grosjean in turn one, but was blocked. The loss of momentum allowed Jenson Button to pull alongside Vettel through turn two and then pass him in turn three. Mark Webber, starting on medium compound tyres, made a great start to jump from 11th to 7th by turn two. Pastor Maldonado made a poor start and fell from 8th to 12th position.

Schumacher pitted on lap two to switch to medium compound tyres. He then served a drive-through penalty on lap five for speeding in the pit lane at the start. Kimi Räikkönen initially had no KERS and was stuck behind Fernando Alonso. Roman Grosjean began to catch up with Lewis Hamilton towards the end of the first stint. Hamilton pitted first on lap 19, taking a second longer than normal due to a wheel gun problem, but Grosjean's pit stop on the next lap was even slower, leaving the running order the same.

Romain Grosjean was finally able to catch Lewis Hamilton on lap 24, only to lose time due to mistakes, and then catch up again by lap 30. Kimi Räikkönen's KERS had recovered by this point, allowing him to make up ground. Jenson Button pitted from 3rd position on lap 35 and got stuck behind Bruno Senna, who was up to 7th running a long stint. Button was unable to pass Senna until Senna pitted on lap 43. This allowed Sebastian Vettel to come out ahead of Button when he pitted on lap 39.

Kimi Räikkönen began turning out blistering lap times in clear air. He pitted for the second time on lap 46, and came out of the pits alongside his teammate Roman Grosjean. Räikkönen pushed Grosjean to the edge of the track in turn 1, Grosjean ran wide, and Räikkönen took second place. Räikkönen then began to reel in Lewis Hamilton, but was unable to pass. Pastor Maldonado slid into the side of Paul di Resta on lap 48, earning Maldonado a drive-through penalty.

In the closing laps of the race, Red Bull pitted both of their drivers. Mark Webber fell from fifth to eighth, where he remained until the end of the race. Sebastian Vettel remained in fourth, and by the last lap was able to catch back up to Romain Grosjean on fresher tyres, but was unable to pass. Narain Karthikeyan pulled off the track and retired on lap 65 due to suspension damage. The final lap of the race was on lap 69 instead of 70 due to the extra formation lap.

This race marked Heikki Kovalainen's 100th race.

It would be eight years until the next race where no Red Bull, Mercedes or Ferrari driver was on the podium, the 2020 Italian Grand Prix.

Classification

Qualifying

Race

Championship standings after the race

Drivers' Championship standingsConstructors' Championship standings

 Note: Only the top five positions are included for both sets of standings.

See also 
 2012 Hungaroring GP2 Series round
 2012 Hungaroring GP3 Series round

References

Hungarian Grand Prix
Hungarian Grand Prix
Grand Prix
Hungarian Grand Prix